Therese Martin Alcala Malvar (born September 16, 2000) is a Filipino actress.

Personal life and acting career
Malvar is the third great-granddaughter of two Philippine heroes, General Miguel Malvar and Dr. José Rizal. She is the daughter of stage and independent film actress Cherry Malvar.

She won awards for her performances in the films Ang Huling Cha-cha ni Anita and Hamog.

Filmography

Television

Films

Awards
Best Actress at the 1st CineFilipino Film Festival 2013 for Ang Huling Cha-Cha ni Anita
Best Actress at Cinema One Originals 2015 for Hamog
Screen International Rising Star Asia Award at the 15th New York Asian Film Festival for Hamog
Outstanding Artistic Achievement Golden Goblet Award at the 2016 Shanghai International Festival for Hamog
Silver St. George Best Actress at the 38th Moscow International Film Festival for Hamog
9th Ani ng Dangal Awardee for Hamog
Best Supporting Actress (triple tie) at the Eddys 2018 (Entertainment Editors' Choice Awards) for Ilawod
Best Supporting Actress (double tie with herself) at the 14th Cinemalaya Independent Film Festival 2018 for the movies Distance and School Service.
Best Young Actress at the 7th Urduja Heritage Film Awards 2020 for Distance

References

External links

GMA Artist Center Profile

2000 births
Actresses from Batangas
Actresses from Laguna (province)
GMA Network personalities
Living people
People from Calamba, Laguna
Tagalog people